The 1912 British Columbia general election was the thirteenth general election for the Province of British Columbia, Canada. It was held to elect members of the Legislative Assembly of British Columbia. The election was called on February 27, 1912, and held on March 28, 1912.  The new legislature met for the first time on January 16, 1913.

The governing Conservative Party increased its share of the popular vote to almost 60%, and swept all but 3 of the 42 seats in the legislature.  Of the remaining three, one (Harold Ernest Forster in Columbia) was formally listed as an Independent but was a Conservative who had missed the filing date.  He campaigned and sat in full support of the McBride government.

The Liberal Party's share of the vote fell from one-third to one-quarter, and it lost both of its seats in the legislature.

The remaining two seats were won by the Socialist Party and the Social Democratic Party in the coal-mining ridings of Nanaimo City and Newcastle.

Results

Notes:

* Party did not nominate candidates in the previous election.

1 Since nine Conservatives were elected by acclamation, i.e., without any polling of votes, the total votes for the Conservative Party and the overall total as well as the popular vote are somewhat misleading. A potential 14,086 voters did not have the opportunity to exercise their franchise. Given a voter turnout of almost 50% in other ridings, the total number of votes could have been about 7,000 more.

Results by riding 

|-
||    
|align="center"  |Henry Esson Young
|align="center"  |AtlinConservative
||    
||    
|align="center"  |Nanaimo City<small>Social Democrat
|align="center"|John Thomas Wilmot Place
||    
|-
||    
|align="center"|John George Corry Wood
|align="center"  |AlberniLiberal
||    
||    
|align="center"  |Newcastle<small>Socialist
|align="center"|Parker Williams
||    
|-
||    
|align="center"|Michael Callanan
|align="center" rowspan=2 |CaribooConservative
||    
|-
|-
||    
|align="center"|John Anderson Fraser
||    
|-
|-
||    
|align="center"|Samuel Arthur Cawley
|align="center"  |ChilliwhackConservative
||    
|-
|-
||    
|align="center"|Harold Ernest Forster
|align="center"  |Columbia<small>Independent Conservative
||    
|-
|-
||    
|align="center"|Michael Manson
|align="center"  |ComoxConservative
||    
|-
|-
||    
|align="center"|William Henry Hayward
|align="center"  |CowichanConservative
||    
|-
|-
||    
|align="center"|Thomas Donald Caven 
|align="center"  |Cranbrook<small>Conservative
||    
|-
|-
||    
|align="center"|Francis James Anderson MacKenzie 
|align="center"  |Delta<small>Conservative
||    
|-
|-
||    
|align="center"|William J. Manson
|align="center"  |Dewdney<small>Conservative
||    
|-
|-
||    
|align="center"|Robert Henry Pooley
|align="center"  |Esquimalt<small>Conservative
||    
|-
|-
||    
|align="center"|William Roderick Ross
|align="center"  |Fernie<small>Conservative
||    
|-
|-
||    
|align="center"|Ernest Miller
|align="center"  |Grand Forks<small>Conservative
||    
|-
|-
||    
|align="center"|John Robert Jackson
|align="center"  |Greenwood<small>Conservative
||    
|-
|-
||    
|align="center"|Albert Edward McPhillips
|align="center"  |The Islands<small>Conservative
||    
|-
|-
||    
|align="center"|James Pearson Shaw
|align="center"  |Kamloops<small>Conservative
||    
|-
|-
||    
|align="center"|Neil Franklin MacKay
|align="center"  |Kaslo<small>Conservative
||    
|-
|-
||    
|align="center"|Archibald McDonald
|align="center"  |LillooetConservative
||    
|-
|-
||    
|align="center"|William Ross MacLean
|align="center"  |Nelson CityConservative
||    
|-
|-
||    
|align="center"|Thomas Gifford
|align="center"  |New Westminster City<small>Conservative
||    
|-
|-
||    
|align="center"|Price Ellison
|align="center"  |Okanagan<small>Conservative
||    
|-
|-
||    
|align="center"|Thomas Taylor
|align="center"  |Revelstoke<small>Conservative
||    
|-
|-
||    
|align="center"|Francis Lovett Carter-Cotton
|align="center"  |Richmond<small>Conservative
||    
|-
|-
||    
|align="center"|Lorne Argyle Campbell
|align="center"  |Rossland City<small>Conservative
||    
|-
|-
||    
|align="center"|David McEwen Eberts
|align="center"  |Saanich<small>Conservative
||    
|-
|-
||    
|align="center"|Lytton Wilmot Shatford
|align="center"  |Similkameen<small>Conservative
||    
|-
|-
||    
|align="center"|William Manson
|align="center"  |Skeena<small>Conservative
||    
|-
|-
||    
|align="center"|William Hunter
|align="center"  |Slocan<small>Conservative
||    
|-
|-
||    
|align="center"|William John Bowser
|align="center" rowspan=5 |Vancouver City<small>Conservative
||    
|-
|-
||    
|align="center"|Alexander Henry Boswell MacGowan
||    
|-
||    
|align="center"|George Albert McGuire
||    
|-
|-
||    
|align="center"|Charles Edward Tisdall
||    
|-
|-
||    
|align="center"|Henry Holgate Watson
||    
|-
|-
||    
|align="center"|Henry Frederick William Behnsen
|align="center" rowspan=4 |Victoria City<small>Conservative
||    
|-
|-
||    
|align="center"|Frederick Davey
||    
|-
|-
||    
|align="center"|Richard McBride
||    
|-
|-
||    
|align="center"|Henry Broughton Thomson
||    
|-
|-
||    
|align="center"|Alexander Lucas
|align="center"  |Yale<small>Conservative
||    
|-
|-
||    
|align="center"|James Hargrave Schofield
|align="center"  |Ymir<small>Conservative
||    
|-
|-
| align="center" colspan="10"|Source: Elections BC
|-
|}

See also
List of British Columbia political parties

Notes

Further reading & references
In the Sea of Sterile Mountains: The Chinese in British Columbia, Joseph Morton, J.J. Douglas, Vancouver (1974).  Despite its title, a fairly thorough account of the politicians and electoral politics in early BC.
 

1912
1912 elections in Canada
1912 in British Columbia
March 1912 events